Cycling was contested at the 2011 Parapan American Games from November 13 to 19 at the Pan American Velodrome in Guadalajara, Mexico. Road cycling events were held on November 13 and 19, while track cycling events were held on November 15 and 16.

Medal summary

Medal table

Medal events

Road cycling

Track cycling

External links
2011 Parapan American Games – Road Cycling
2011 Parapan American Games – Track Cycling

Events at the 2011 Parapan American Games
2011 in road cycling
2011 in track cycling
2011 Parapan American Games
2011 in cycle racing